Fontibre is a locality of the municipality Hermandad de Campoo de Suso, in Cantabria. It is located 3 km from Reinosa.

The source of the Ebro River is located in Fontibre. In fact, this name derives from the Latin words Fontes Iberis, source of the Ebro.

Populated places in Cantabria